Fatty acid desaturase 2 (FADS2) is encoded by the FADS2 gene, the associated enzyme is sometimes known as FADS2 as well.  Its main associated enzyme is Delta 6 desaturase (D6D) however the human enzyme been shown to also catalyze some delta-8 and delta-4 desaturases despite naming conventions.

Function 

Fatty acid desaturase 2 is a member of the fatty acid desaturase (FADS) gene family. Desaturase enzymes cause desaturation of fatty acids through the introduction of double bonds between defined carbons of the fatty acyl chain. FADS family members are considered fusion products composed of an N-terminal cytochrome b5-like domain and a C-terminal multiple membrane-spanning desaturase portion, both of which are characterized by conserved histidine motifs. This gene is clustered with family members FADS1 and FADS2 at 11q12-q13.1; this cluster is thought to have arisen evolutionarily from gene duplication based on its similar exon/intron organization.

Clinical significance 

It was reported the FADS2 interacts with breastfeeding such that breast-fed children with the "C" version of the gene appear about 7 intelligence quotient (IQ) points higher than those with the less common "G" version (less than this when adjusted for maternal IQ).

An attempt to replicate this study in 5934 8-year-old children failed: No relationship of the common C allele to negative effects of formula feeding was apparent, and contra to the original report, the rare GG homozygote children performed worse when formula fed than other children on formula milk. A study of over 700 families recently found no evidence for either main or moderating effects of the original SNP (rs174575), nor of two additional FADS2 polymorphisms (rs1535 and rs174583), nor any effect of maternal FADS2 status on offspring IQ.

References

Further reading

 

 

EC 1.14.19